Pietro Saja (Sessano del Molise, 1779 - Naples, 1833) was an Italian painter, active in Naples and Caserta in a Neoclassical style.

Biography
He was a pupil of Johann Heinrich Wilhelm Tischbein at the Academy of Fine Arts of Naples, but was sent with a stipend to study in the Academy of St Luke in Rome. In 1803, Saja became member of the Roman Academy. He painted "La Vestale", about the legend of the Burial Alive of the Vestal Virgin Rhea Silvia. He also painted the Apotheosis of the Government of Ferdinand I, King of the Two Sicilies (La Gloria dei Borbone, 1816) for the Palace of Caserta.

Among other works, Saja painted a Death of Virginia (1802-1804), Death of Hector, Tancred discovers Clorinda, a Madonna for the King, St Francis Xavier for the Queen. He painted in the church of San Leucio near Caserta.

References

Rosanna Cioffi, Pietro Sana, pittore neoclassico napoletano, in "Napoli Nobilissima", 3, XIII, 1974,pp. 27 – 33;

See also
Civiltà dell'Ottocento : le arti figurative, Napoli : Electa, 1997.

1779 births
1833 deaths
18th-century Italian painters
Italian male painters
19th-century Italian painters
Painters from Naples
Italian neoclassical painters
Accademia di Belle Arti di Napoli alumni
19th-century Italian male artists
18th-century Italian male artists